Janówka may refer to the following places in Poland:
Janówka, Lower Silesian Voivodeship (south-west Poland)
Janówka, Gmina Biała Podlaska in Lublin Voivodeship (east Poland)
Janówka, Gmina Piszczac in Lublin Voivodeship (east Poland)
Janówka, Chełm County in Lublin Voivodeship (east Poland)
Janówka, Podlaskie Voivodeship (north-east Poland)
Janówka, Bełchatów County in Łódź Voivodeship (central Poland)
Janówka, Łódź East County in Łódź Voivodeship (central Poland)
Janówka, Piotrków County in Łódź Voivodeship (central Poland)
Janówka, Włodawa County in Lublin Voivodeship (east Poland)
Janówka, Zamość County in Lublin Voivodeship (east Poland)
Janówka, Opole Voivodeship (south-west Poland)
Janówka, Pomeranian Voivodeship (north Poland)